Abe is the 25th most common Japanese surname. Notable people with the surname include:

, Japanese socialite, radio personality and wife of Shinzō Abe, former Prime Minister of Japan
, Japanese announcer and actress
, Japanese writer
, Japanese singer and actress
, Japanese voice actor
, Japanese synchronized swimmer
, Japanese footballer
, Japanese mixed martial artist
, Japanese politician
, Japanese singer-songwriter
, Japanese lawyer, police bureaucrat and politician
, pen name of Naoya Abe, Japanese manga writer
, Japanese-English actress
, Japanese general
, Japanese judoka
, 7th-century Japanese general
, Imperial Japanese Navy admiral
, Japanese footballer
, Japanese poet
Hiroshi Abe (disambiguation), multiple people
Hiroyuki Abe (disambiguation), multiple people
, Japanese zoologist
, Japanese judoka
, Japanese poet
, Japanese hammer thrower
, Japanese Christian socialist and politician
, Japanese photographer
, Japanese footballer
, Japanese politician
, Japanese politician, father of Shintaro Abe
, Japanese judoka
, Japanese jazz saxophonist
, Japanese table tennis player
Katsuo Abe, Imperial Japanese Navy Admiral
Kazuhisa Abe (1914-1996), American senator and judge in Hawaii
, Japanese bobsledder
, Japanese baseball player
, Japanese sport wrestler
, Japanese writer
Kazuya Abe, Japanese mixed martial artist
, Japanese karateka
, Japanese classical composer and marimba player
, Japanese World War II flying ace
, Japanese shogi player
, Japanese footballer
, Japanese martial artist in the United Kingdom
, Japanese baseball player
, Japanese fencer
, pen name of Kimifusa Abe, Japanese writer
, Japanese human rights activist
, Japanese comedian
, Japanese classical composer
, Japanese poet
, Japanese shogi player
, Imperial Japanese Navy admiral
, Japanese animator
, Japanese singer-songwriter
, Japanese baseball player
, Japanese Rōjū and daimyō
, Japanese samurai
, Japanese daimyō
, Japanese daimyō
, Japanese daimyō
, Japanese footballer
, Japanese academic in Buddhist philosophy and comparative religion
, Japanese Nordic combined skier
, Japanese daimyō
, Japanese politician
, Japanese daimyō
, Japanese daimyō
, Japanese architect and civil engineer
, Japanese model
, Japanese samurai
, Japanese samurai
, Japanese singer and actress
, Japanese scholar, administrator, and waka poet
, Japanese figure skating coach and choreographer
, Japanese long jumper
, Japanese singer and actress
, Japanese fashion model
, Japanese Buddhist monk
, Japanese general, politician and Prime Minister of Japan
, Japanese footballer
, Japanese motorcycle racer
, Imperial Japanese Army officer
, Japanese anime director
Osamu Abe (disambiguation), multiple people
, Japanese actor
, Japanese academic
, Japanese convicted murderer, prostitute and actress
, Japanese actor
, Japanese samurai
, American politician
, Japanese sport wrestler
Satoru Abe (born 1926), American sculptor
, Japanese onmyōji
, Japanese calligrapher and aikidoka
, Japanese basketball player
, Japanese baseball player
, Japanese baseball player
, Japanese politician, father of Shinzo
, Japanese curler and curling coach
, Japanese politician and longest-serving postwar Prime Minister of Japan
, Japanese idol, actress and singer
, Japanese footballer
, Japanese footballer
, Japanese politician
, Japanese footballer
, Japanese daimyō
, Japanese aikidoka
, Japanese rower
, Japanese field hockey player
, Japanese politician
, Japanese shogi player
, Japanese hurdler
, Japanese footballer
, Japanese footballer
, Japanese table tennis player
, Japanese footballer
, Japanese footballer
, Japanese ichthyologist
, Japanese ultramarathon runner
, Japanese baseball player
, Japanese writer, social critic, humanist and translator
, Japanese politician
, Japanese actor
, Japanese baseball player
, Japanese baseball player
, Japanese politician
, Japanese footballer
, Japanese actor
, Japanese judoka
, Japanese cyclist
, Japanese announcer, television personality, and news anchor
, Japanese musician
Abe no Yasuna, a disciple of Kamo no Yasunori and father of Abe no Seimei
, Japanese academic
, Japanese samurai
, Japanese musician and record producer
, Japanese general
, Japanese footballer
, Japanese zoologist
, Japanese footballer
, Japanese philosopher, educator and politician
, Japanese graphic artist
, Japanese cyclist
, Japanese television journalist and actor
, Japanese footballer
, Japanese footballer
, better known as Yumi Ohka, Japanese professional wrestler
, Japanese Paralympic cross-country skier and biathlete
, Japanese footballer
, Japanese film director
, Japanese footballer

Other people
Magnus Ngei Abe (born 1965), Nigerian politician
David Abe, American electrical engineer

See also
Abe clan, a Japanese clan

References

Japanese-language surnames